Yan Miles, ACE, is an English television and film editor. He is best known for his on the Netflix series The Crown and BBC Television series Sherlock.

Career
Yan began his career working for Stanley Long. Yan won his first Emmy award for the Nick Hurran directed Sherlock: His Last Vow in 2014. He is a member of the American Cinema Editors (ACE) and the British Film Editors (BFE). His latest project with A24 and Apple TV+ features Sharper.

Filmography

Awards and nominations

References

External links
 

Living people
British television editors
British film editors
Year of birth missing (living people)